Pachyonychus is a genus of flea beetles in the family Chrysomelidae containing a single described species, P. paradoxus, from the United States.

The name is extremely similar to a different flea beetle, Pachyonychis paradoxa, named in 1860, that occurs on the same host plant.

References

Alticini
Monotypic Chrysomelidae genera
Articles created by Qbugbot
Taxa named by Frederick Ernst Melsheimer